Barry Kenneth Harvey is a New Zealand former rugby league footballer who represented New Zealand in three test matches, including matches that counted towards the 1988 World Cup.

Playing career
A 1983 Junior Kiwi, Harvey played for the Western Suburbs club in the Taranaki Rugby League and became a Taranaki and Central Districts representative.

He was first picked for the New Zealand national rugby league team for the 1986 tour of Australia. In 1987 he moved south, joining the Randwick Kingfishers in the Wellington Rugby League. He became a Wellington representative, and later captained the side. New Zealand did not play any test matches in 1987, however , Harvey was selected in a New Zealand XIII that lost 14-18 to Queensland.

Harvey captained the New Zealand Māori team in the 1988 Pacific Cup. He was again picked for the New Zealand side in 1989 and played one test match against Australia.

Legacy
In 2008 he was named in the Taranaki Rugby League Team of the Century.

References

New Zealand rugby league players
New Zealand Māori rugby league players
New Zealand Māori rugby league team players
New Zealand national rugby league team players
Taranaki rugby league team players
Randwick Kingfishers players
Central Districts rugby league team players
Wellington rugby league team players
Rugby league hookers
Junior Kiwis players
Living people
Year of birth missing (living people)